S. D. Subramania Yogi (30 November 1904 – 27 July 1963) was a Tamil director, playwright, screenplay writer and poet from Tamil Nadu, India.

Life
He was born in a family of poets  and published his first collection of poems, while still a student at the Erode Mahajana High School in 1924. He became involved in the Indian Independence Movement and wrote many poems in support of the Indian nationalist cause. He was given the title "Bhala Bharathi" in appreciation of his Tamil literary skills. Among his noted works are Bhavani Kuravanji, a translation of Omar Kayyam's works into Tamil and the life stories of Mary Magdalene and Ahalya. After becoming well known in the field of literature, Yogi started writing scripts for Tamil films. His first film as script writer - Iru Sahodarargal (1936) was a success and the literary magazine Manikodi praised him for his dialogues. He went on to write scripts and song lyrics for a number of Tamil films till the 1950s. He also directed two films - Adrishtam (1939) and Krishnakumar (1941).
 Yogi translated many of film related English technical terms into Tamil and published a model screenplay using the terms in the magazine Gundoosi.

In 2000, the Government of Tamil Nadu nationalised his works.

Filmography

As script writer
Iru Sahodarargal (1936)
Krishnabakthi (1948)
Lakshmi (1953)

As director
Adrishtam (1939)
Krishnakumar (1941)

References

External links

Tamil poets
Tamil film directors
Tamil screenwriters
1963 deaths
1904 births
Screenwriters from Tamil Nadu
Film directors from Tamil Nadu
Poets from Tamil Nadu
20th-century Indian poets
20th-century Indian film directors